Kade Craig (born 10 December 2002) is an English professional footballer who plays as a defender for  club Shrewsbury Town.

Career
Craig played for the youth team at Birmingham City, before joining the under-18 team at Shrewsbury Town and turning professional at the club in June 2022. He made his first-team debut on 30 August, playing in a centre-back partnership with Declan Hutchings in a 2–1 defeat to Wolverhampton Wanderers U21 in an EFL Trophy fixture at the New Meadow. On 28 October, he joined National League North club AFC Telford United on a one-month loan. However he dislocated his shoulder in training and returned to Shrewsbury to have surgery and rehabilitation. He signed a contract extension at Shrewsbury in December, keeping him at the club until the end of the 2022–23 season.

Style of play
Craig is a defender who can play as a left-sided centre-back, left-back or at left-wing-back.

Career statistics

References

2002 births
Living people
English footballers
Association football defenders
Birmingham City F.C. players
AFC Telford United players
Shrewsbury Town F.C. players
English Football League players
National League (English football) players
Black British sportspeople